Petrophile is a  genus  of evergreen shrubs, in the family Proteaceae. The genus is endemic to Australia. Commonly known as conebushes, they typically have prickly, divided foliage and produce prominently-displayed pink, yellow or cream flowers followed by grey, conical fruits.

Taxonomy
The genus Petrophile was first formally described in 1809 by Joseph Knight in On the cultivation of the plants belonging to the natural order of Proteeae, preempting publication of the same name by Robert Brown in his book On the natural order of plants called Proteaceae.

The name Petrophile is derived from the Greek words petra = rock and philos = seeking or preferring, referring to the rocky habitat in which some species grow.

Species list 
The following is a list of Petrophile species and subspecies accepted by the Australian Plant Census as at November 2020:

Petrophile acicularis R.Br. (W.A.)        	
Petrophile aculeata Foreman (W.A.)
Petrophile anceps R.Br. (W.A.)
Petrophile antecedens Hislop & Rye (W.A.) 
Petrophile arcuata Foreman (W.A.) 
Petrophile aspera C.A.Gardner ex Foreman (W.A.) 
Petrophile axillaris Meisn. (W.A.) 
Petrophile biloba R.Br. - granite petrophile (W.A.)
Petrophile biternata Meisn. (W.A.) 
Petrophile brevifolia Lindl. (W.A.)
Petrophile canescens A.Cunn. ex R.Br. (Qld., N.S.W.)
Petrophile carduacea Meisn. (W.A.) 
Petrophile chrysantha Meisn. (W.A.) 
Petrophile circinata Kippist ex Meisn. (W.A.) 
Petrophile clavata Hislop & Rye (W.A.) 
Petrophile conifera Meisn. (W.A.)
 Petrophile conifera Meisn. subsp. conifera
 Petrophile conifera subsp. divaricata Hislop & K.A.Sheph.
Petrophile crispata R.Br. (W.A.)
Petrophile cyathiforma Foreman (W.A.) 
Petrophile divaricata R.Br. (W.A.)          	
Petrophile diversifolia R.Br. (W.A.)          	 
Petrophile drummondii Meisn. (W.A.) 
Petrophile ericifolia R.Br. (W.A.)
 Petrophile ericifolia R.Br. subsp. ericifolia
 Petrophile ericifolia subsp. subpubescens (Domin) Foreman
Petrophile fastigiata R.Br. (W.A.)          	
Petrophile filifolia R.Br. (W.A.)
 Petrophile filifolia R.Br. subsp. filifolia
 Petrophile filifolia subsp. laxa Rye & Hislop
Petrophile foremanii Rye & Hislop (W.A.) 
Petrophile glauca Foreman (W.A.)      
Petrophile globifera Rye & K.A.Sheph. (W.A.)
Petrophile helicophylla Foreman (W.A.) 
Petrophile heterophylla Lindl. (W.A.)          
Petrophile imbricata Foreman (W.A.) 
Petrophile incurvata W.Fitzg. (W.A.)  
Petrophile juncifolia Lindl. (W.A.)         	 
Petrophile latericola Keighery (W.A.)  
Petrophile linearis R.Br. - pixie mops (W.A.) 
Petrophile longifolia R.Br. (W.A.)           
Petrophile macrostachya R.Br. (W.A.) 
Petrophile media R.Br. (W.A.)          	  
Petrophile megalostegia F.Muell. (W.A.) 
Petrophile merrallii Foreman (W.A.) 
Petrophile misturata Foreman (W.A.) 
Petrophile multisecta F.Muell. (S.A.) 
Petrophile nivea Hislop & Rye (W.A.) 
Petrophile pauciflora Foreman (W.A.) 
Petrophile pedunculata R.Br. - conesticks (N.S.W.)       	 
Petrophile phylicoides R.Br. (W.A.)         	 
Petrophile pilostyla Rye & Hislop (W.A.)
 Petrophile pilostyla subsp. austrina Rye & Hislop 
 Petrophile pilostyla Rye & Hislop subsp. pilostyla
 Petrophile pilostyla subsp. syntoma Rye & Hislop         
Petrophile plumosa Meisn. (W.A.) 
Petrophile prostrata Rye & Hislop (W.A.)       	 
Petrophile pulchella (Schrad. & J.C.Wendl.) R.Br. (Qld., N.S.W.)          	 
Petrophile recurva Foreman (W.A.)   
Petrophile rigida R.Br. (W.A.)        
Petrophile scabriuscula Meisn. (W.A.)      
Petrophile semifurcata F.Muell. ex Benth. (W.A.)           
Petrophile seminuda Lindl. (W.A.)          	  
Petrophile septemfida Rye & Sheph. (W.A.)
Petrophile serruriae R.Br. (W.A.)          	  
Petrophile sessilis Sieber ex Schult.  - prickly conesticks (N.S.W.)
Petrophile shirleyae F.M.Bailey (Qld.) 
Petrophile shuttleworthiana Meisn. (W.A.)         	  
Petrophile squamata R.Br. (W.A.)           
Petrophile striata R.Br. (W.A.)          	 
Petrophile stricta C.A.Gardner ex Foreman (W.A.) 
Petrophile teretifolia R.Br. (W.A.)      
Petrophile trifurcata Foreman (W.A.) 
Petrophile vana Cranfield & T.D.Macfarl. (W.A.)
Petrophile wonganensis Foreman (W.A.)

Distribution
Species within this genus predominantly occur in Western Australia, but several species are found in other states including South Australia, New South Wales and Queensland.

Use in horticulture
Plants in this genus, particularly those from Western Australia, require a freely draining soil . They tolerate periods of dryness and mild frosts and will grow well in full sun or part shade. They can be  propagated from cuttings taken in autumn or from seed, however the production of new plants by either method can be slow.

References

 
Proteaceae genera
Proteales of Australia
Taxa named by Robert Brown (botanist, born 1773)
Endemic flora of Australia